Malcolm Watson Dixon (1934 – 9 April 2020) was an English actor, best known for playing the role of Strutter in the 1981 film Time Bandits. He had many roles which took advantage of his  height, such as ewoks and dwarfs.

Life and career
Malcolm Dixon was born in Crook, County Durham, in 1934, as the youngest of seven brothers and the only child with dwarfism. He was raised in Crook. His parents died when he was young and he outlived all his brothers.

Dixon worked on his parents' poultry farm and as a floral artist. He was discovered by a talent agent who was keen on Dixon's talents with ice skates at the Durham Ice Rink. He then worked in an ice show at Empire Pool, Wembley. His stature and physical abilities landed him work with Jim Henson's Creature Shop, where he worked in multiple films and television shows until becoming an independent actor, most notably starring in Time Bandits and also in Willy Wonka and the Chocolate Factory as an Oompa-Loompa (an uncredited role). He featured in many music videos for artists including David Bowie, Duran Duran and Spandau Ballet.

Dixon was married to Anita Dixon and had two children. He died in Blackpool on 9 April 2020, at the age of 85.

Filmography
Dixon had acted in over 30 film and TV productions, including:

Theatre
His main leading role in theatre was as Bilbo Baggins in an adaptation of J. R. R. Tolkien's The Hobbit at the Fortune Theatre in London, England, from 1986 to 1989. From 2000 to 2020, he was a regular in panto productions of Snow White and the Seven Dwarfs. His other theatre roles included:
The Lion, the Witch and the Wardrobe at Phoenix Arts Center, Leicester, England
Peter Pan at The Palladium
Sleeping Beauty on Ice in 1968 at Empire Pool, Wembley

References

External links
 
 
 Dixon at Hollywood.com

1934 births
2020 deaths
20th-century English male actors
21st-century English male actors
Actors with dwarfism
English male film actors
English male stage actors
People from Crook, County Durham
Actors from County Durham